Dublin, Wicklow and Wexford Railway (DW&WR) 42 to 44, built in 1883, were a set of three 2-4-0T tank locomotives built by Beyer, Peacock and Company in 1883, and the first for the DW&WR with side tanks.  For their size they were considered to be very capable.  In particular No. 44 was overhauled at Dundalk works in 1923 and was regularly allocated then to the 5.15pm Greystones express which usually consisted of size bogie coaches.  Upon amalgamation to the Great Southern Railways (GSR) in 1925 it was determined these locomotives would be withdrawn and they were not allocated GSR locomotive numbers or class codes however despite this No. 44 was permitted to run up to 1927. 

No further 2-4-0Ts were built for DW&WR by Beyer-Peacock but locomotive superintendent William Wakefield chose to construct 11 more of the 2-4-0T configuration at Grand Canal Street from 1885.

Notes and references

Notes

References

2-4-0T locomotives
5 ft 3 in gauge locomotives
Railway locomotives introduced in 1885
Scrapped locomotives
Steam locomotives of Ireland
Beyer, Peacock locomotives